Nicholas Tufton, 3rd Earl of Thanet (7 August 1631 – 24 November 1679), styled Lord Tufton until 1664, was an English nobleman.

Tufton was the eldest son of John Tufton, 2nd Earl of Thanet, and Lady Margaret, daughter of Richard Sackville, 3rd Earl of Dorset and Lady Anne Clifford. Through his father, he was a great-great-grandson of Lord Burghley. He was imprisoned in the Tower of London in 1655 and again from 1656 to 1658, for allegedly conspiring to capture Charles II. In 1664 he succeeded his father in the earldom. 

He successfully claimed the barony of de Clifford through his maternal grandmother Lady Anne Clifford (which had been in abeyance since the death of his great-grandfather George Clifford, 3rd Earl of Cumberland). This barony conferred the honour of hereditary High Sheriff of Westmorland.

Lord Thanet married Lady Elizabeth, daughter of Richard Boyle, 2nd Earl of Cork, on 11 April 1664. They had no children. He died in November 1679, aged 48, and was succeeded in the earldom by his younger brother, John. The Countess of Thanet died in September 1725.

References

|-

1631 births
1679 deaths
17th-century English nobility
High Sheriffs of Westmorland
Earls of Thanet
Barons de Clifford
Prisoners in the Tower of London
Prisoners and detainees of England and Wales